ACG School Jakarta is an independent co-educational international school in South Jakarta, Indonesia. The school was established in 2004, and is a school for children from 3 to 17 years of age. Currently it has 500 students from 42 different nationalities and is owned by the Academic Colleges Group based in New Zealand. Academic Colleges Group owns a total of seven schools in New Zealand and also schools in Vietnam and Indonesia and has over 6000 students and 600 teaching staff from 40 countries.

History
ACG School Jakarta was founded in 2004 and has grown rapidly. Since May 2010 ACG School Jakarta has been an IB World School and offers the IB Primary Years Programme (PYP). From August 2017 ACG School Jakarta also be offering the IB Diploma Programme (IBDP).

Campus
A new purpose built campus was opened in 2012 to provide quality educational facilities for the roll of 500 students,. The new buildings include 24 new classrooms as well as 2 science laboratories, a technology centre, music and arts rooms and a large modern canteen complete with a multi-purpose sports centre and auditorium. A full-sized junior soccer field with a surrounding athletic track and a large covered multi-purpose court will also be part of the new campus.

Curriculum
Since May 2010 the ACG School Jakarta has been authorised to offer the IB Primary Years Programme for students aged 3–11. This programme is taught in English and is open for male and female students.

ACG School Jakarta offers the University of Cambridge International Examinations (CIE), which is the world largest provider of international education programmes and qualifications for 5–19 year olds.
Beginning in Year 7, the students sit the Checkpoint examinations at the end of Year 9 and then enter for International General Certificate of Secondary Education (IGCSE) at the end of Year 11. 

For Y12 and Y13 students at ACG School Jakarta, from August 2017 the school will transition from the CIE AS and A Level examinations to the IB Diploma Programme.

References

International schools in Greater Jakarta
Cambridge schools in Indonesia
Educational institutions established in 2004
2004 establishments in Indonesia
Schools in Jakarta